General Jewish Labour Bund usually refers to the original incarnation of the Labour Bund of Lithuania, Poland and Russia.

General Jewish Labour Bund may also refer to:

 General Jewish Labour Bund in Latvia
 General Jewish Labour Bund in Poland
 General Jewish Labour Party